7th VFCC Awards
January 9, 2007

Best Film: 
 Children of Men 

Best Canadian Film: 
 The Rocket 
The 7th Vancouver Film Critics Circle Awards, honoring the best in filmmaking in 2006, were given on 9 January 2007.

Winners

International
Best Actor: 
Forest Whitaker - The Last King of Scotland
Best Actress: 
Helen Mirren - The Queen
Best Director: 
Alfonso Cuarón - Children of Men
Best Film: 
Children of Men
Best Foreign Language Film: 
Volver (To Return), Spain
Best Supporting Actor: 
Alan Arkin - Little Miss Sunshine
Best Supporting Actress: 
Cate Blanchett - Notes on a Scandal

Canadian
Best Actor: 
Don McKellar - Monkey Warfare
Best Actress: 
Carrie-Anne Moss - Fido
Best British Columbia Film: 
Fido
Best Director:
Reginald Harkema - Monkey Warfare
Best Film: 
The Rocket
Best Supporting Actor: 
J.R. Bourne - Everything's Gone Green
Best Supporting Actress: 
Nadia Litz - Monkey Warfare

References

2006
2006 film awards
2006 in British Columbia
2006 in Canadian cinema